Moutaz Al-Khayyat (born 16 April 1983) is a Qatari businessman based in Doha, Qatar. He is the Chairman of Power International Holding and UrbaCon Trading & Contracting (UCC), one of the largest global building and contracting companies. He is a Founder Partner and Chairman of Baladna Food Industries and Chairman of Estithmar Holding.

Early life    
Moutaz Al-Khayyat was educated at the University of the West of Scotland. Al-Khayyat’s father, Mohamad Raslan Al Khayyat, founded Al Khayyat Contracting and Trading (KCT) in 1983. Al Khayyat Contracting and Trading was one of the largest construction and trading companies in Qatar. It expanded its operations into neighbouring countries, undertaking several large and complex projects ranging from highways and bridges, to infrastructure works, factories, commercial complexes and luxury residential and hotel facilities.

Career

Baladna 
Al-Khayyat co-founded Baladna Food Industries in March 2014. In November 2019, Baladna launched its initial public offering. The IPO was received positively and became oversubscribed. The company offers a range of more than 250 product lines within the dairy category, including milk, yoghurt, Laban, cheese, juices and organic fertilizers. A herd of 22,000 cattle produces 400,000 litres of milk a day.

Qatar Diplomatic Crisis 
Al-Khayyat rose to prominence during the Qatar Diplomatic Crisis as the “Man who airlifted 4,000 dairy cows” into the country to bypass the Saudi blockade of the country.

UCC Holding 
Al-Khayyat and his brother Ramez Al-Khayyat founded Urbacon Trading & Contracting (UCC) in Qatar, as second-generation owners. UCC Holding is one of the GCC’s main grade one licensed building and contracting companies.

Power International Holding 
Al-Khayyat is the Chairman of Power International Holding. The company consists of a diverse portfolio of businesses from five main sectors: general contracting, real estate development, food industries, lifestyle and services.

In September 2022, Power International was listed by Forbes in the Middle East's Top 100 Arab Family Businesses, ranking thirteenth.

Estithmar Holding 
Al-Khayyat was appointed as Chairman of Estithmar Holding QPSC, a listed company on the Qatar Stock Exchange, in April 2022. In the same month, Estithmar acquired Elegancia Group, a group of 29 companies with 30,000 employees working in healthcare, services, ventures, contracting and industries.

Other 
Al-Khayyat is the Chairman of Aura Group, which operates in the food and beverage sector and family entertainment outlets in Qatar. He is also the Chairman of Assets, a real estate company that has developments in the residential, hospitality and commercial sectors.

References

External links 
 UrbaCon Trading & Contracting
 Baladna Food Industries
 Power International Holding

Living people
1983 births
People from Doha
Qatari businesspeople
Alumni of the University of the West of Scotland